Rebecca is a German-language musical based on the 1938 novel of the same name by Daphne du Maurier. It was written by Michael Kunze (book and lyrics) and Sylvester Levay (music), the authors of the musicals Elisabeth, Mozart! and Marie Antoinette. The plot, which adheres closely to the original novel, revolves around wealthy Maxim DeWinter, his naïve new wife, credited as "Ich" ("I"), and Mrs. Danvers, the manipulative housekeeper of DeWinter's Cornish estate Manderley. Mrs. Danvers resents the new wife's intrusion and persuades the new wife that she is an unworthy replacement for the first Mrs. DeWinter, the glamorous and mysterious Rebecca, who perished in a drowning accident. The new Mrs. DeWinter struggles to find her identity and take control of her life among the shadows left by Rebecca.

The musical premiered on 28 September 2006 at the Raimund Theater in Vienna, Austria, where it ran for three years. Subsequent productions have been mounted in Finland, Korea, Japan and elsewhere.

Background
As a teenager, Michael Kunze had read Daphne du Maurier's novel Rebecca. In the 1990s, he re-read it and decided that the story would make a good musical. He traveled to Cornwall, England, to find du Maurier's son in an attempt to obtain the rights to musicalize the work, which had been denied to other librettists. Attending a performance of Kunze's long-running 1992 musical Elisabeth in Vienna persuaded du Maurier's son that the novel would be in good hands with Kunze and his musical partner Sylvester Levay. 
 
Writing the libretto took Kunze nearly two years, and Levay took another two years to compose the music. A 2003 demo recording in English was made, with Pia Douwes as Mrs. Danvers, Maike Boerdam as "I" and Uwe Kröger as Maxim de Winter. Workshops were also presented in Essen and Vienna.

Kunze and Levay formed a collaboration with American director Francesca Zambello and English set designer Peter J. Davison. In early 2005, they decided to launch the musical in Vienna, Austria, with the production company Vereinigte Bühnen Wien, which had previously produced Kunze's musicals Elisabeth, Tanz der Vampire (Dance of the Vampires), and Mozart!.

Synopsis

Act I
A young woman, "I", dreamily walks among "shadows"; in the background, Manderley appears destroyed by fire ("Ich hab getraumt von Manderley"). "I" reveals her "paid companion" clothes, as she is transported to  a hotel in Monte Carlo in April 1926. Her employer is a wealthy American, Mrs. Van Hopper ("Du wirst niemals eine Lady"). Widowed, aristocratic Maxim de Winter enters, as the hotel guests gossip ("Er verlor unerwartet seine Frau, Rebecca"). In the dramatic hills near Monte Carlo, Maxim kisses "I", his worldly charm sweeping the inexperienced girl off her feet. Back in the hotel, "I" is told that she is to return to New York. She reflects on the memories she shared with Maxim. ("Zeit in einer Flashe") Moments later, Maxim comes in and asks "I" to marry him.

Maxim and "I" honeymoon in Italy and then drive up to his stately Cornwall estate, Manderley. The servants enter and talk about what they’d think their new mistress will be like. ("Die neue Mrs. de Winter"). The haughty head housekeeper Mrs. Danvers, who oversees the well-organized servants, is cold and hostile to "I". Later, in the morning room, Mrs. Danvers is alone lamenting about Maxim's first wife, Rebecca ("Sie ergibt sich nicht"). "I" comes in and accidentally breaks a statue of Cupid; she is frightened. Mrs. Danvers fears that she is an unworthy replacement for the beautiful, elegant and mysterious Rebecca. Maxim's sister Beatrice and her husband Giles arrive at Manderley to meet "I". The three get along well and are in a happy mood ("Die lieben verwandten"). In the library, "I" becomes tipsy and Mrs. Danvers comes in to tell Maxim that the Cupid statue is broken. "I" admits to doing it, causing a fight between her and Maxim ("Bist du glücklich - Bist du böse"). At night, "I" and Maxim reflect on how they are seeking solace in each other ("Hilf mir durch die Nacht"). At her house, Beatrice reflects on her affection for her brother and how he has changed in the past year ("Was ist nur los mit ihm"). In Rebecca's room, Rebecca's cousin Jack Favell tries Mrs. Danvers' patience ("Sie war gewohnt geliebt zu werden"), arguing about Rebecca's possessions and the fact that Rebecca “loved him” and that he was “her favorite cousin”. "I" comes in and meets Favell who tells her not to tell Maxim he was at Manderley. "I" and Mrs. Danvers discuss an upcoming masked ball and Danvers suggests "I" wear a dress that copies a portrait of one of Maxim's ancestors. Unbeknownst to "I", this is part of Mrs. Danvers's plan to humiliate her. Then, Mrs. Danvers worshipfully describes Maxim's first wife, Rebecca, who drowned while sailing on Maxim's sailboat a year earlier.

Members of an elite golf club gossip about Maxim and his new wife ("Wir sind British"). Later, Ben, a mentally handicapped man, is in the boat house ("Sie's fort") and meets "I". He rambles about how she is better than Rebecca until Maxim returns and finds that "I" is near the boathouse. This causes Maxim to fly into a rage due to his dark memories ("Gott, warum"). Frank Crawley is in his office discussing the upcoming ball as well as the late Rebecca with "I". He reassures her that she doesn't need to be just like Rebecca to gain Maxim's love and be socially respected ("Ehrlichkeit und vertrauen"). Later at the ball, everyone is waltzing ("Der Ball von Manderley"). Mrs. Van Hopper enters ("I'm an American Woman"). "I" is in her room in the dress Mrs. Danvers suggested she wear, hoping to impress both the guests and Maxim ("Heut' nacht verzauber' ich die Welt"). She emerges and begins to descend the staircase to the party. The guests freeze in horror, realizing that the dress "I" is wearing is the same one Rebecca had worn at last year's ball. Maxim bursts into fury and "I" runs upstairs crying, while Mrs. Danvers looks on malevolently.

Act II
At night, "I" stands outside Rebecca's room hoping to sort out the previous night's accident, while Mrs. Danvers is inside the room ("Und das, und das, und das"). Mrs. Danvers makes "I" uncomfortable and she runs off when Mrs. Danvers menaces her ("Tu nicht, was sie empört!" ... "Nur ein schritt"). At the seaside, the people of Cornwall find the remains of a shipwreck and with it, Rebecca's boat with her body inside the cabin("Flotsam and Jetsam"). "I" runs to the boat house and sees Ben and a disheveled Maxim, who had gone to help the sailors. He tells "I" that Rebecca was a manipulative and deceitful person and that he never really loved her. After he confronted Rebecca about her multiple affairs, an altercation between the two ensued, in which Maxim snapped and pushed Rebecca, causing her to hit her head and die from a concussion. He had panickedly hid the body in the boat. ("Now she has returned" ... "No smile was ever so cold"). Maxim is suspected of having killed Rebecca, and an investigation is taking place. The next morning in the house, Beatrice is panicking about the hearing but notices and subsequently compliments "I"'s newfound confidence (Die Stärker Einer Frau). "I" confronts Mrs. Danvers, having had enough of her unfair treatment, and makes some changes in the house's decor, discarding all of Rebecca's items ("Mrs. de Winter bin Ich"). "I" is now a confident woman; when she breaks the Cupid statue again, she is no longer frightened.

At a nearby courtroom, a hearing takes place, with Maxim and Horridge, the coroner, at odds. "I" faints, and everyone returns to Manderley. Danvers and Favell arrive at Manderley and go to the library. Mrs. Danvers leaves and Favell remains in the library ("Eine Hand wäscht die andre"). Frank and "I" unsuccessfully try to get him to leave. Favell tries to blackmail Maxim with a letter from Rebecca and accuses him of murdering her but lacks sufficient proof so he calls Mrs. Danvers and asks for Rebecca's diary. It is revealed that Rebecca had gone to see a man named Dr. Baker on the day she died. Favell assumes she was pregnant and Maxim killed her out of jealousy because the nonexistent child wasn't his but no one knows the real reason. Standing by her husband, "I" takes initiative, deciding to visit Dr. Baker in London to find out why Rebecca visited him, while Maxim is ordered to stay at Manderley until the truth is found out. The servants and Mrs. Danvers comment on the situation ("Sie fuhr'n um acht"). Maxim picks up a phone call from "I", who explains that Rebecca was terminally ill with a form of cancer, likely instigating her own death by provoking Maxim because she did not want to die slowly and painfully. Mrs. Danvers overhears and learns that Rebecca was going to die of cancer.

After this liberating news, Maxim can finally remove the picture of Rebecca from Manderley and completely focus on his new wife. Maxim picks up "I" at the train station in Cornwall, and they kiss passionately ("Jenseits der Nacht"). As they prepare to return, they see a red glow in the distance and realise that Manderley is in flames. Maxim and "I" hurry home as the servants run around with buckets of water ("Feuer, feuer, Manderley in Flammen!"). Mrs. Danvers stands inside the house atop the staircase with Rebecca's nightgown, holding a candelabra in her hand as the flames consume Manderley. Maxim and "I" arrive, and Frank runs towards them. Inside, Danvers inclines the candles to the stairway handrail and sets it ablaze. The house collapses and Mrs. Danvers perishes in the flames together with her memories of Rebecca.

"I" walks dreamily in darkness ("Ich hab getraumt von Manderley" (reprise)). Everyone except Maxim is standing among Manderley's ruins, but now the shadows have faces. Under a bright blue sky, Maxim holds his hand out to "I" who runs to him, and they kiss.

Productions

Vienna

Rebecca had its world premiere at the Raimund Theater in Vienna, in German, in September 2006, "where it played to sold-out houses totaling more than three years". It was directed by Zambello and choreographed by Denni L. Sayers, with production design by Davison, with costumes by Birgit Hutter and lighting by Andrew Voller. The cast starred Wietske van Tongeren as "Ich" ("I"), Uwe Kröger as Maxim and Susan Rigvava-Dumas as Mrs. Danvers.

Variety magazine considered the Vienna production a "dream of a show", adding:

Michael Kunze and Sylvester Levay deliver a work every bit as compelling as their hit Elisabeth, the most successful German-language musical of all time, while Francesca Zambello's dazzling, cinematic production offers storytelling at its best, clearly defining the whirlpool of emotions experienced by the three tortured principal characters. ... Kunze's deft lyrics take us deep into the psyches of the never-named heroine (simply called "I"); moody, mercurial Maxim de Winter; obsessive Mrs. Danvers; and even the late Rebecca herself. Levay knows how to write tunes that jam in your head; he delivers the goods with Mrs. Danvers' haunting "Rebecca" and the anthem "The Power of a Woman in Love". ... Designer Peter J. Davison stunningly captures the atmosphere, from heady summer nights on the Riviera to the oppressive decay of Manderley.

Wietske Van Tongeren has all the endearing pipsqueak qualities to make the nameless heroine endearing, expertly conveying the slow transformation from little brown mouse to confident, strong woman. Her performance is marred only by her screechy pop vocal production. ... Kroger has built a substantial career on his pretty-boy looks. As Maxim, they work against him: He seems too young, too fey, too lightweight for such a haunted, world-weary character. His singing, while impassioned, is merely adequate, but he rises to the challenge of confessing his hatred for Rebecca in "No Smile Was Ever as Cold". ... Mrs. Danvers gets the best music, and in Susan Rigvava-Dumas has found a perfect interpreter. ... With a rich mezzo-soprano as her weapon, she embodies evil born of passion and jealousy in a multi-layered turn.

Reviewing the Vienna production on a night when an understudy was playing the protagonist "I", the critic of The Times, Benedict Nightingale, praised the fidelity of the plot to du Maurier's original and rated the staging "up to the most lavish West End visual standards. ... Only the shipwreck that leads to the discovery of Rebecca's body disappoints – and only a gallumphingly Wodehousean golfing number (Wir Sind Britisch) needs excising." Nightingale judged the ending of the musical "forgivably ... a bit more upbeat than the novel's." He found the dancing dull and the music "seldom harsh or imaginative enough" despite "a terrific central song, a soaring, grieving tribute" to Rebecca by "Susan Rigvava Dumas's mesmeric Danvers". He said of Kröger's Max, "though white-hot at moments of crisis, [he] hasn't quite the mix of brooding inwardness and outer sang froid the character needs."

2008 Japan production
Rebecca was then produced at the Imperial Theatre in Tokyo, opening on 6 April 2008. Later there was a 2010 production and 2018-19 10th anniversary production. In 2010 a studio recording of Japanese Cast was released .

European productions
The musical was performed in Helsinki, Finland, at the Helsingin kaupunginteatteri (Helsinki City Theatre) from 28 August 2008 to 9 May 2009. as well as in Kouvola, Finland, at the Kouvolan Teatteri on 11 September 2010.Rebecca played in Budapest, Hungary, on 18 and 19 March 2010 (and later in repertory).

On 7 February 2014 the musical opened in Malmö, Sweden at Malmö Opera. Director was Åsa Melldahl and Musical Director Anders Eljas.

Productions have also played in Stuttgart, Germany; St. Gallen, Switzerland; Moscow, Russia; Belgrade, Serbia; Bucharest, Romania; and Ostrava, Czechia.

2009 West End readings
In 2009, Ben Sprecher co-produced two English-language readings of Rebecca, hoping to mount a London West End production.  In October 2009, a reading featured Sierra Boggess as "I", Brent Barrett as Maxim and Pia Douwes as Mrs. Danvers. The English-language book was written by Christopher Hampton in collaboration with Kunze.

U.S. reading and cancelled Broadway production
A reading took place on 18 March 2011 in New York, directed by Michael Blakemore and Francesca Zambello. The cast featured Boggess as "I", Hugh Panaro as Maxim, Carolee Carmello as Mrs. Danvers and James Barbour as Jack Favell.  A Broadway production of the musical was announced twice during 2012, to be co-directed by Blakemore and Zambello. However, the producers cancelled both times after financing for the production fell through, even though there were $1 million in advance ticket sales. In October 2012, The New York Times reported that four of the "investors" in the proposed Broadway production never existed. Following criminal investigations by the FBI and federal prosecutors in Manhattan, Mark Hotton, the middleman who fabricated the fictitious investors, and received $60,000 in fees, was arrested and charged with fraud. In January 2013, producer Ben Sprecher told an interviewer that he hoped to mount the show on Broadway later in 2013. Although after completing an investigation the Securities and Exchange Commission pursued no action against Sprecher and his partner, the producers were unable to raise enough funding for a 2014 Broadway opening. On 24 April 2017, during a trial concerning the musical, it was announced that Sprecher and Louise Forlenza had lost the rights to produce the show, and, therefore, the show will not be pursuing a Broadway run.

2013 Korean production
Rebecca premiered in Korea in January 2013, and was met with both critical and commercial success. The cast included Yoo Jun-sang, Ryu Jung-han, and Oh Man-seok as Maxim, Lim Hye-young and Kim Bo-kyung as "I", and Ock Joo-hyun and Shin Young-sook as Mrs. Danvers. In the 2013 7th Annual Musical Awards, the production won 5 awards, with Ock Joo-hyun as the Best Featured Actress, Robert Johanson as the Best Director, Jung Seung-Ho as the Best Scenic Designer, Jack Mehler as the Best Lighting Designer, and Kim Ji-Hyeon as the Best Sound Designer.

2023 Off West End production
Rebecca is scheduled to have its English language premier running at Off West End's Charing Cross Theatre from 4 September 2023 to 18 November 2023. The London premier with an orchestra of 18, will be directed by Alejandro Bonatto and has a new English translation by Christopher Hampton and Michael Kunze.

Characters and original cast

Songs in the original production
This list includes a literal translation of the German song titles into English

Act I
Ich hab geträumt von Manderley ("Ich", Shadows) – I dreamt of Manderley
Du wirst niemals eine Lady (Mrs. van Hopper, "Ich") – You will never be a lady!
Er verlor unerwartet seine Frau Rebecca (Ensemble) – He lost his wife Rebecca unexpectedly
Am Abgrund ("Ich", Maxim) – At the abyss
Zeit in einer Flasche ("Ich") – Time in a bottle
Hochzeit (Instrumental) – Wedding
Zauberhaft Natürlich (Maxim)- Naturally Enchanting ¥
Die neue Mrs. de Winter (Ensemble, Mrs. Danvers, Crawley) – The new Mrs. de Winter
Sie ergibt sich nicht (Mrs. Danvers) – She won't surrender
Die lieben Verwandten (Beatrice, "Ich", Giles) – The dear relatives
Bist Du glücklich? ("Ich", Maxim) – Are you happy?
Bist Du böse? ("Ich", Maxim) – Are you angry?
Hilf mir durch die Nacht ("Ich", Maxim) – Help me through the night
Was ist nur los mit ihm? (Beatrice) – What's wrong with him?
Sie war gewohnt, geliebt zu werden (Mrs. Danvers, Favell) – She was used to being loved
Rebecca - Version 1 (Mrs. Danvers, Ensemble)
Wir sind britisch (Ensemble) – We are British#
Sie's fort (Ben) – She's gone
Gott, warum? (Maxim) – God, why?
Ehrlichkeit und Vertrauen (Crawley) – Honesty and trust
Ball von Manderley (Ensemble) – The Ball at Manderley^
I'm an American Woman (Mrs. van Hopper)
Heut Nacht verzaubere ich die Welt ("Ich", Clarice) – Tonight I'm going to enchant the world
Finale Erster Akt (Mrs. Danvers & Ensemble) – Finale: Act One

Act II
Entr'acte
Und Das und Das und Das ("Ich") – And this and this and this
Rebecca - Version 2 (Mrs. Danvers, "Ich", Shadows)
Nur ein Schritt (Mrs. Danvers) – Just one step
Strandgut (Ensemble, "Ich", Crawley, Favell) – Flotsam and jetsam
Sie's fort – Reprise (Ben)
Du liebst sie zu sehr ("Ich") – You love her too much
Kein Lächeln war je so kalt (Maxim) – Never was a smile that cold
Die Stärke einer Frau (Beatrice, "Ich") – The power of a woman
Die Neue Mrs. de Winter – Reprise (Ensemble)
Mrs. de Winter bin Ich! ("Ich", Mrs. Danvers) – I am Mrs. de Winter!
Die Voruntersuchung (Ensemble) – The Enquiry
Eine Hand wäscht die andre Hand (Favell) – One Hand washes the other^
Sie's fort – Reprise (Ben)
Sie fuhr'n um Acht (Ensemble) – They drove at eight o'clock
Keiner hat Sie durchschaut (Maxim) – No one saw through her
Rebecca – Reprise (Mrs. Danvers, Shadows)
Jenseits der Nacht ("Ich", Maxim) – Beyond the night^
Manderley in Flammen (Maxim, Mrs.Danvers, Ensemble, Crawley) – Manderley in Flames
Ich hab geträumt von Manderley ("Ich", Shadows) – I dreamt of Manderley

-Replaced with the song Merkwürdig, where the servants make fun of “Ich”, in the St. Gallen and subsequent productions

¥-Written for the 2010 Japan production and used in all productions afterwards

^-Shortened for the Stuttgart production

Recordings
The original Vienna cast recording, Rebecca – Das Cast Album, a studio recording, was released on 24 November 2006. It has 22 tracks. It peaked number 18 on the Ö3 Austria Top 75 album chart.

One of the songs from the show, "The Power of a Woman in Love", was released in English, as a single sung by Gloria Gaynor, prior to the Viennese premiere.

Rebecca – Gesamtaufnahme Live (Rebecca – Complete Recording Live) was recorded on 6 and 7 June 2007. The 2-CD live recording was released on 19 October 2007. Its 44 tracks include the entire production, including all spoken dialogue and songs. The recording also includes a bonus track: Marika Lichter, who performed Mrs. Van Hopper from the summer of 2007 through the end of 2007, singing "I'm an American Woman".

Rebecca – Original Japanese Cast Recording was released on 5 March 2010. The CD has 10 tracks, including "Zauberhaft Natürlich", which was written for this production.

Rebecca – Original Hungarian Cast Recording was released on 22 May 2010. It includes 16 tracks.

Rebecca – Gesamtaufnahme Live was recorded in 2012, this time with the Stuttgart cast featuring Valerie Link as “Ich”, Jan Amman as Maxim de Winter, Pia Douwes as Mrs. Danvers, and Kerstin Ibald reprising her role as Beatrice

References

External links

2006 musicals
Musicals based on novels
Musicals by Michael Kunze
Musicals by Sylvester Levay
Works based on Rebecca (novel)